WKYX-FM (94.3 MHz) is a radio station broadcasting a news/talk format. WBMP (570 AM) is a radio station broadcasting an urban contemporary format. WBMP is licensed to Paducah, Kentucky, United States, and WKYX-FM is licensed to serve Golconda, Illinois. WKYX-FM's programming is also heard on WNGO (1320 AM) in Mayfield, Kentucky. The stations are owned by Bristol Broadcasting Company, Inc. and feature programming from Fox News Radio, Premiere Networks, Salem Radio Network, and Westwood One.

On January 26, 2023 WKYX 570 AM and translator W265DZ 100.9 FM split from the news/talk simulcast with WKYX-FM and WNGO and changed their format to urban contemporary, branded as "102.5/100.9 The Beat", under new WBMP call letters.

References

External links

KYX